Mostafa Mokri (December 6, 1921 – January 3, 2005) was an Iranian footballer. He served most of his career at Toufan. He was also former chairman of IRIFF and Persepolis.

Playing career
Mokri joined Toufan in 1940, when Hossein Sadaghiani was a member of the team. Those years, they had a huge contest with Daraei for Tehran League championship. He won Tehran League in 1944 and was called up for Tehran XI team.

Chairmaning career

Iran football federation
Mokri became chairman of Iran football federation twice.
He made a good contribution and caused a revolution in Iranian football system in his chairmaning career.
The first period was between 1958 and 1960, which he established "Iranian Regional cup" _The very first football league consisting teams from different parts of Iran_ in that. 
in the second period, between 1967 and 1972, Iran national football team won Asian Cup twice. Masoud Boroumand was his deputy during this time.

Persepolis F.C.
Mokri was selected as chairman of Persepolis F.C. by Ali Abdeh in 1975, and remained at the post until Iranian Islamic Revolution in 1979.

Personal life
Mokri retired from football in 1944. He went to France and graduated in physical education. Then he married a French woman. His wife died in 1993.

References

Presidents of Iranian Football Federation
Iranian football chairmen and investors
2005 deaths
1921 births
Iranian footballers
Association footballers not categorized by position